Pallasovka is a town and the administrative center of Pallasovsky District in Volgograd Oblast, Russia, located on the Torgun River (which flows into the Volgograd Reservoir),  northeast of Volgograd, the administrative center of the oblast. Population:

History
It was founded in 1907 as a settlement of Torgun servicing the construction of a railway station of the same name. That same year, Torgun was renamed Pallasovka in honor of an academician Peter Pallas (1741–1811), who visited the area in 1773–1774. It was granted town status in 1967.

Administrative and municipal status
Within the framework of administrative divisions, Pallasovka serves as the administrative center of Pallasovsky District. As an administrative division, it is, together with three rural localities, incorporated within Pallasovsky District as the town of district significance of Pallasovka.

As a municipal division, the territory of Pallasovka is incorporated within Pallasovsky Municipal District as Pallasovka Urban Settlement. The three rural localities are incorporated as Limannoye Rural Settlement of Pallasovsky Municipal District.

The meteorite
Peter Pallas was a famous naturalist who took part in the discovery and the study of the first pallasite, a type of stony-iron meteorite named after him. Coincidentally, Pallasovka is a pallasite meteorite found near the town and named after it.

References

Notes

Sources

Cities and towns in Volgograd Oblast